Dangerous Games is an Armenian drama television series created by Anush Petrosyan. The series premiered on Kentron TV on December 14, 2015. Director of the series is Angel Martirosyan, who is also a member of cast. Camera operator is Armenian-American Vahe Avedian. Screenwriter is Rafayel Tadevosyan. Production manager is Gegham Margaryan. Sound engineer is Bahieh Claggett. The series takes place in California, United States.

Cast and characters
Armen Zargaryan as Mark
Levon Sharafyan
Alla Tumanyan
Shahen Badalyan
Razmik Mansuryan
Khachatur Hunanyan
Vahan Margaryan
Angel Martirosyan
Lusine Gasparyan
Susanna Nidelyan
Anna Panni
Marine Minasyan
Hayk Grigoryan
Artur Sukiasyan
Edgar Rostomyan
Albert Diloyan
Davit Sargsyan
Vartan Torosyan
Stepan Babujyan
Mkrtich Setoyan
Dwayne Johnson
Alton Mills
Bianca Doria
Slim Khezri
Stephon Steward
Akrem Abdu
Destiny Soria
Troy Musil
Mike Hro
Gor Yepremyan as Gor

References

External links

 
 Dangerous Games on armserial.com
 Dangerous Games on ArmFilm.org
 Dangerous Games on hayojax.am
 Dangerous Games at the Internet Movie Database

Armenian drama television series
Armenian-language television shows
2015 Armenian television series debuts
2010s Armenian television series
Kentron TV original programming